Britha biguttata is a moth of the family Erebidae first described by Francis Walker in 1866. It is found in India, Sri Lanka, Java, New Guinea, Bismarck Islands, Sulawesi, Java, Borneo, Myanmar, Taiwan and Australia.

The wings are brownish with variegated markings. Labial palpi are covered densely with spiky hairs.

References

Moths of Asia
Moths described in 1866
Erebidae
Hypeninae